Raiffeisen Bankengruppe is the larger of two groups of cooperative banks in Austria (another one was Austrian Volksbanks).

Structure

The roughly 490 local cooperatives (Raiffeisenbanken) are organized in nine Raiffeisen-landesbanken, one for each federal state, with only Vienna and Lower Austria sharing one. Only Carinthia has two Raiffeisenlandesbanken, with the Zveza Bank serving the Slovene minority. Owned by their respective member banks, most Raiffeisenlandesbanken are cooperatives themselves (regGenmbH), with some having recently switched to the legal status of Aktiengesellschaft. Together, they own their national umbrella institute, the Raiffeisen Bank International, via a shareholders' agreement.

 Raiffeisenlandesbank Niederösterreich-Wien AG
 Raiffeisenlandesbank Oberösterreich AG,
 Raiffeisen-Landesbank Steiermark AG
 Raiffeisenlandesbank Burgenland regGenmbH
 Raiffeisenlandesbank Kärnten - regGenmbH
 Zveza Bank, r.z.z o.j. Bank und Revisionsverband regGenmbH
 Raiffeisenverband Salzburg regGenmbH
 Raiffeisen-Landesbank Tirol AG
 Raiffeisenlandesbank Vorarlberg regGenmbH

See also

 Raiffeisenbank
 Credit union
 German Cooperative Financial Group

References

External links
  

Cooperative banks of Austria
Raiffeisen Zentralbank
Banks under direct supervision of the European Central Bank